The Hong Kong Housing Authority (HA) is the main provider of public housing in Hong Kong. It was established in April 1973 under the Housing Ordinance and is an agency of the Government of Hong Kong. In the same year, the Resettlement Department and the Building Section of the Urban Services Department were merged to form the Housing Department, which acts as the Housing Authority's executive body.

History
The modern Housing Authority was founded in 1973.

In 2005, most Housing Authority-owned shopping centres and car parks were controversially divested to The Link REIT.

A citywide scandal erupted in 2015 after heavy metals were found in the water supply of some housing estates, schools, and private residential buildings. The contamination was first identified at Kai Ching Estate, opened in 2013. A task force found that the contamination was caused by solder joints with high lead content.

Responsibilities 
Outside of public housing provision, the authority is also responsible for the management of public rental housing estates, interim housing estates, transit centres, demolished factories and ancillary commercial and non-domestic facilities such as shopping centres, market stalls and car parks. It also acts as the agent for the government when it comes to clearing land, and according to its own policy "preventing squatting and implementing improvements in squatter areas."

Though most commercial assets of the Housing Authority were divested to the Link REIT in 2005, the Housing Authority still manages some shopping centres as well as 21 markets. There have been calls for the government to buy back the properties sold to the Link as rent increases have placed a financial burden on public housing residents.

Composition 
At the time of its creation, membership of the authority was made up as follows:
 Secretary of Housing (Chairman)
 Eight Urban Councillors
 Five unofficial members
 Six official members
Currently, members are appointed by the Chief executive of Hong Kong. They are: the chairman, Vice-chairman, two official members and 26 non-official members.

Roles 
The Authority operates the Tenants Purchase Scheme, the Home Ownership Scheme and the Private Sector Participation Scheme. They were also formerly responsible for a loan scheme targeted at low-income home buyers, which provided interest-free loans of up to HK$530,000 or monthly mortgage subsidies of up to HK$3,800 to help low-income individuals or families buy their own flats.

More than 8,000 low-income families are subsidised, although the scheme was halted in 2003 pending a review. In June 2004, the definitive abolition of the scheme was announced.

In 2019, the 4,871 flats from six estates was largest number of subsidised homes put on the market since the Home Ownership Scheme was restarted in 2011;
But only 54 of 80 randomly selected buyers turned up – a low turnout rate that would have been unheard of in the past.

Key people
Since 1 July 2007, following a reorganisation of government agencies, the role of Chairman of the Housing Authority is held by the Secretary for Transport and Housing (a position created in 2007). This role was previously held by the Secretary for Housing, Planning and Lands. The Director of Housing is Vice-chairman of the HA.
Past and present Chairpersons of the Hong Kong Housing Authority have included:
 Eva Cheng: 2017–present (2nd term)
 Anthony Cheung: 2012–2017
 Eva Cheng: 2007–2012 (1st term)
 Michael Suen: 2002–2007
 Dr. Cheng Hon-kwan: 2000–2002
 Dame Dr. Rosanna Wong Yick-ming: 1992–2000
 Sir David Akers-Jones: 1987–1992

Location 
The Hong Kong Housing Authority Headquarters are located at 33 Fat Kwong Street, Ho Man Tin, Kowloon. The Hong Kong Housing Authority Exhibition Centre is located nearby at 3/F, Homantin Plaza, 80 Fat Kwong Street.

See also 
 Public housing in Hong Kong
 Hong Kong Housing Society
 The Link REIT
 List of public housing estates in Hong Kong
 List of Home Ownership Scheme Courts in Hong Kong
 My Home Purchase Plan
 Public factory estates in Hong Kong

References

Further reading

External links 

 

Public housing in Hong Kong
Statutory bodies in Hong Kong
1973 establishments in Hong Kong
Hong Kong government departments and agencies